Events in the year 1840 in Brazil.

Incumbents
Monarch – Pedro II

Events
Last remaining group of Cabanagem rebels, under leadership of Gonçalo Jorge de Magalhães, surrenders
Ragamuffin War: rebels of the Riograndense Republic refused an offer of amnesty by the Empire of Brazil, although it was clear that they had no chances of winning

Births
 9 June - Custódio José de Melo

Deaths

 
1840s in Brazil
Years of the 19th century in Brazil
Brazil
Brazil